German submarine U-257 was a Type VIIC U-boat of Nazi Germany's Kriegsmarine during World War II. She was laid down at the Bremer Vulkan yard at Bremen-Vegesack on 22 February 1941 as yard number 22. She was launched on 19 November and commissioned on 14 January 1942 under the command of Kapitänleutnant Heinz Rahe.

U-257 was assigned to the 5th U-Boat Flotilla for training, then transferred to the 3rd U-boat Flotilla for operational service.

She was sunk by Allied warships in mid-Atlantic on 24 February 1944.

Design
German Type VIIC submarines were preceded by the shorter Type VIIB submarines. U-257 had a displacement of  when at the surface and  while submerged. She had two shafts and two  propellers.

U-257 was fitted with five  torpedo tubes (four fitted at the bow and one at the stern), fourteen torpedoes, one  SK C/35 naval gun, 220 rounds, and two twin  C/30 anti-aircraft guns. The boat had a complement of between forty-four and sixty.

Service history
The boat carried out six patrols, but did not sink or damage any ships. She was a member of seven wolfpacks.

First patrol
U-257s first patrol began on 21 September 1942 from Bergen in Norway. Her route took her across the North Sea, through the gap between the Faroe and Shetland Islands and into the Atlantic Ocean. She docked at La Pallice in occupied France, on 18 October.

Second, third and fourth patrols
These sorties passed without major incident.

Fifth patrol
The boat was attacked from the air twice in one day. In the afternoon, it was much the same story, but this time a Whitley from No. 10 OTU was involved. One man from the U-boat's crew was wounded. A second Whitley from the same unit arrived, but could only exchange fire with the submarine as it had expended all its depth charges in a previous engagement, the boat escaped.

Sixth patrol and loss
The submarine had moved to St. Nazaire; she departed from this French Atlantic port on 2 January 1944. (A former crew member from Waskesiu has stated that Nene merely picked survivors up). Thirty men died in the sinking, there were nineteen survivors.

Wolfpacks
U-257 took part in seven wolfpacks, namely:
 Luchs (27 September – 6 October 1942) 
 Falke (28 December 1942 – 19 January 1943) 
 Landsknecht (19 – 28 January 1943) 
 Seewolf (25 – 30 March 1943) 
 Adler (7 – 13 April 1943) 
 Meise (13 – 20 April 1943) 
 Specht (21 – 25 April 1943)

References

Bibliography

External links

German Type VIIC submarines
U-boats commissioned in 1941
World War II submarines of Germany
1941 ships
U-boats sunk by British warships
U-boats sunk by Canadian warships
U-boats sunk in 1944
Ships built in Bremen (state)
Maritime incidents in February 1944